McClellan's General Store is an historic structure located in New London, Iowa, United States.    James and Adeline McClellan moved to Henry County in 1856. He bought the lot for $365 in 1867 and had the building built for a mercantile business that he founded the same year.  It was the first building constructed in the simplified Italianate style in town  He added dry goods to his store in 1875 and the business was renamed McClellan and Stottard Dry Goods Store at about the same time. The McClellan family used the second floor as their residence for several years  The building was listed on the National Register of Historic Places in 2003.

References

Commercial buildings completed in 1867
Italianate architecture in Iowa
New London, Iowa
Buildings and structures in Henry County, Iowa
National Register of Historic Places in Henry County, Iowa
Commercial buildings on the National Register of Historic Places in Iowa
1867 establishments in Iowa